Kasey Kenneth Kahne (born April 10, 1980) is an American dirt track racing driver and former professional stock car racing driver. He last competed in the Monster Energy NASCAR Cup Series in 2018, driving the No. 95 Dumont Jets/Procore Technologies Chevrolet Camaro ZL1 for Leavine Family Racing. Currently, Kahne competes in the World of Outlaws Sprint Car Series, driving the No. 9 sprint car for his own team, Kasey Kahne Racing.

Off the track, Kahne is active in charitable work and is a member of the President's Council on Service and Civic Participation. He also owns his own race team, Kasey Kahne Racing, which competes in the World of Outlaws series, fielding two World of Outlaws sprint cars for himself, and Brad Sweet. Kahne is a 2-time Skagit Speedway winner of the Annual Jim Raper memorial Dirt Cup (2002 and 2003) and currently holds the fastest lap record there.

Kahne scored 18 career wins in the Cup Series, including three Coca-Cola 600s in 2006, 2008, and 2012, and the Brickyard 400 in 2017. He also was the NASCAR Nextel Cup Series Rookie of the Year in 2004. He retired from racing before the end of the 2018 Cup Series season due to health reasons and was replaced at Leavine Family Racing by Regan Smith.

Racing career

Beginnings
Kahne began racing open wheel sprint cars at Deming Speedway at 17 in Deming, Washington, before moving up to Skagit speedway in Alger, Washington, and then he moved to USAC. In 2000, Kahne made a trip to Pennsylvania where he won the season opener at the historic Williams Grove Speedway. He was hired by Steve Lewis, who had also employed future NASCAR drivers Jeff Gordon, Jason Leffler, Tony Stewart and Kenny Irwin Jr.  In his first year on the circuit, he was named Rookie of the Year, as well as winning the national midget championship. He continued to run USAC, as well as the Toyota Atlantic Series and the World of Outlaws.

Xfinity and Truck Series
In 2002, Kahne made 20 starts in the Busch Series driving the No. 98 Channellock-sponsored Ford Taurus for Robert Yates Racing. His best finish was a tenth-place finish at Cabela's 250. A year later, he moved to the No. 38 Great Clips-sponsored Ford for Akins Motorsports full-time. He won his first pole at Michigan International Speedway and his first Busch Series race at the Ford 300. Kahne finished 7th in the points standing.

With his move to full-time competition in the Cup Series in 2004, he also drove 30 races for Akins in the Busch Series, finishing 13th in points. In 2005, he made 22 starts in the Busch Series, splitting time with Akins and Evernham's new No. 6 team. He won the O'Reilly 300 at Texas Motor Speedway and the United Way 300 at Kansas Speedway.

On May 26, 2007, Kahne won the Busch Series' Carquest Auto Parts 300 race at Lowe's Motor Speedway for his first win of 2007. On August 24, 2007, Kahne won the pole for the Cup Series' Sharpie 500 at Bristol, his second pole of the 2007 Nextel Cup Series season. Later that night, during the Busch Series' Food City 250, Kahne passed Ryan Newman on the top side in a 3-wide pass that included Jason Leffler on the bottom. He held off the hard-charging Leffler to score his seventh career Busch win and his second of 2007.

In 2009, Kahne ran fewer events in other NASCAR series than previous seasons, only seven (four in the Nationwide Series, three in the Whelen Modified Tour). With less distractions, Kahne's Sprint Cup stats slightly improved that year.

During the 2014 Nationwide season, Kahne scored an upset win at the Nationwide Series' Subway Firecracker 250 passing teammate Regan Smith on the final lap. The margin was 0.021 seconds.

Kahne has six career starts in the NASCAR Camping World Truck Series, winning five of them; his lone non-victory is a second-place run at Pocono Raceway in 2010. In 2004, he made a pair of starts in the series at Darlington Raceway and Homestead-Miami Speedway, driving the No. 2 Team ASE Racing Dodge Ram for Ultra Motorsports, winning both races. At the 2015 Charlotte Truck race, he held off Erik Jones for the win by .005 seconds, the second-closest margin in Truck Series history.

Cup Series
Kahne replaced Bill Elliott in the No. 9 Dodge for Evernham Motorsports at the end of the 2003 season when Elliott announced a part-time schedule starting with the 2004 season. Since Kahne was still under contract with Ford, the manufacturer filed a lawsuit against him after he joined Evernham Motorsports. U.S. District Judge Robert Cleland ruled in favor of Kahne; citing a clause in his contract with Ford that stipulated that the manufacturer had to provide Kahne with a full-time ride on a Ford team that both parties mutually agreed upon. That clause also stipulated, that if an agreement could not reached by either party, then Kahne could seek a ride with a different manufacturer, without breaking the terms of his contract with Ford.

Evernham Motorsports (2004–07)

In 2004, Kahne surprised many by nearly winning several races (including five second-place finishes and 13 Top 5’s), winning four poles, and captured the Raybestos Rookie of the Year Award. He narrowly missed the Chase for the Nextel Cup after Jeremy Mayfield, his teammate, claimed the final spot.

In 2005, Kahne scored his first career Nextel Cup victory in his sophomore season of 2005, after a dominating performance in the Chevy American Revolution 400 at Richmond International Raceway. It was also the first win for the Dodge Charger, which returned to NASCAR that year. It was the first time a Dodge won a race at Richmond International Raceway since Richard Petty did so in 1975. In addition, he became the first driver born in the 1980s to win a race in NASCAR's premier series. He also scored two poles in back-to-back weeks at Darlington and Richmond during the same year. Despite this, he was plagued with inconsistency and slumped to 23rd in the points.

On March 20, 2006, Kahne won the rain-delayed Golden Corral 500 at Atlanta Motor Speedway. Nearly three weeks later, he won the Samsung/Radio Shack 500 at Texas. After that, he won four more races — a season sweep at Lowe's Motor Speedway in the Coca-Cola 600 and in the Bank of America 500 holding off Jimmie Johnson (who finished second in both races) and victories at California and Michigan.

On September 9, 2006, Kahne successfully raced his way into the Chase for The Cup after finishing third in Richmond. He was the 10th and last qualifier to make the Chase. He edged defending Nextel Cup Champion Tony Stewart out by 16 points, but a disappointing 16th-place finish at New Hampshire, a crash at Dover, and running out of gas at Kansas ended his hopes for his first championship title. Kahne finished strong with five Top 10’s in the remaining seven races including a winning the Bank of America 500 at Charlotte Motor Speedway.

On November 27, 2006, Kahne was honored by being invited to raise the traditional 12th Man flag prior to the Seattle Seahawks Monday Night Football game against the Green Bay Packers at Qwest Field in Seattle. The ceremony has been ongoing since 2003, and involves a different Seattle-area sports hero and/or beloved member of the community kicking things off before every Seahawks home game. The Seahawks beat the Packers 34–24.

During the qualifying for the 2007 Daytona 500, officials found holes in the wheel-wells of his Dodge Charger.  A crew member said it was just tape that had fallen off of a hole in the tire. Officials said that the tape had been cut.  He was one of the four drivers among Matt Kenseth and his two teammates, Scott Riggs and Elliott Sadler, whose cars had been found with aerodynamic-improving modifications.  His team was one of the six teams found with illegal modifications in the Daytona festivities.

At the Sharpie 500, a day after winning the pole and the Busch race, Kahne dominated most of the race leading 305 out of 500 laps and finished second to Carl Edwards. This was his best finish of the 2007 season. After a disappointing 2007 season, Kahne finished 19th in points with zero wins, one Top 5, eight Top 10’s, and an average finish of 22.2.

Gillette Evernham Motorsports and Richard Petty Motorsports (2008–10)

With the new sponsor Budweiser, Kahne started off the 2008 season strong by finishing in the Top 10 in both the Budweiser Shootout and the Gatorade Duel.

As a result of fourth-place finish in the duel, Kahne started 10th in the 50th Daytona 500 on February 17, 2008. He finished seventh behind teammate Elliott Sadler in the 2008 Daytona 500, was a repeat of the 2007 race where they both also finished sixth and seventh respectively.

In the early laps of the Auto Club 500, Kahne worked his way from 20th to 14th, but brushed the wall on lap 7. However, he was able to finish ninth after the race went under a long rain delay. Kahne had to start in the back due to an engine change in the UAW-Dodge 400 at Las Vegas Motor Speedway, but he did go on to finish sixth.

On May 17, 2008, Kahne was voted into the Sprint All-Star Race XXIV by his fans via cell phone text messaging and online voting. After making a required "stop-and-go" pit stop, Kahne began the fourth segment second on old tires. He went on to win the race and earn $1,012,975. Kahne became the first driver to win the race from the fan vote and the third driver to race in the Sprint Showdown and go on to win the All-Star race.

On May 25, 2008, he won his second Coca-Cola 600 passing Tony Stewart with two laps to go, as Stewart had a flat tire going into turn 1. This was Kahne's first points-paying win of the season. He also became the sixth driver to win the 600 and the Sprint All-Star Race in the same season.

On June 6, 2008, Kahne won the Pocono 500 from the pole despite being 38th at one point during the race after a miscue in the pits. On June 20, 2008, he won another pole for the Toyota/Save Mart 350 at Infineon Raceway, his second pole in three races. However, after handling issues early in the race, Kahne fell victim to pit road, went a lap down, and finished 33rd.

Following two consecutive 40th-place finishes (a Bristol Motor Speedway wreck caused by miscommunications between Casey Mears and his spotter, and an engine failure at Michigan International Speedway), Kahne found himself sitting outside of the Top 12, out of contention for the Chase. At the start of the last regular season race, at Richmond International Raceway, he, David Ragan, and Clint Bowyer were vying for that 12th spot. Unfortunately for him, Kahne was not able to make up enough points to put him into the Chase for the Sprint Cup. He missed the 2008 Chase by 69 points and ended the season finishing 14th.

Kahne's new team for 2009, Richard Petty Motorsports, was the result of a merger between his team's previous incarnation, Gillett Evernham Motorsports and Petty Enterprises. The year started off inconsistent for Kahne, with early Top 10 finishes at Atlanta and Bristol. Kahne won the Toyota/Save Mart 350 event on June 21, 2009, for his first road course win.

After a hot summer streak that saw three top 10s in a row, Kahne climbed into Chase contention. During the Pep Boys Auto 500 on September 6, 2009, Kahne made a late race pass and held off Kevin Harvick for his second win of the season. Following the first 26 races of the season Kahne was in the Top 12 in points, earning him a place in the Chase for the Championship. He was seeded fourth in points. After suffering an engine failure at New Hampshire and a crash in California, Kahne struggled to get back into contention for the championship and finished 10th in the final season standings, despite finishing second in the AMP Energy 500 at Talladega Superspeedway.

On September 10, 2009, it was announced that Richard Petty Motorsports would merge with Yates Racing. Kahne would remain as one of four drivers of RPM alongside his current teammates Sadler and Allmendinger, as well as Yates Racing driver Paul Menard.  The team changed manufacturers to Ford and received Roush-Yates engines and other equipment from Roush Fenway Racing.

Driving the new Ford Fusion car, Kahne won the Gatorade Duel No. 2 at Daytona International Speedway on February 11, 2010. He also finished in second position in the 2010 Budweiser Shootout. Kahne ended up 30th in the Daytona 500 after being wrecked late in the race. He had been running up front for most of the race and had the fastest lap of the race. Kahne had a strong car at the Auto Club 500; however he spun late in turn 4.

Kahne had a good run at Atlanta a few weeks later where he led the most laps in the race, and finished inside the Top 5. During the following couple of months, Kahne would be unable to compete for race wins as mistakes and wrecks put a dent into the team's Chase hopes.

During the Gillette Fusion ProGlide 500 at Pocono Raceway he had a top-five car all race long, but due to a late race caution, some teams stayed out on track instead of joining the leaders on pit-road. This put Kahne in the back end of the Top 20, and during the green-white-checkered finish Kahne tried to make it three-wide while battling for tenth place. However, he was blocked and ran down into the wet grass by his teammate A. J. Allmendinger. Kahne spun back into the racing surface and was hit by Greg Biffle and Mark Martin. The No. 9 car took off and landed on top of the outside wall, hit a tree behind the wall and span back onto the track on all four wheels. Kahne and Biffle both put the blame on Allmendinger for causing the huge crash.

Kahne rebounded from the disappointment at Pocono by leading laps in the following race at Michigan and finishing second, behind the dominant Denny Hamlin. He also qualified on pole for the Toyota/Save Mart 350 at Infineon Raceway the following week; and converted the pole position into a solid fourth-place finish; after bouncing back from a poor first stint, to post back-to-back Top 5 finishes.

In qualifying for the 2010 Carfax 400 at Michigan International Speedway, Kahne earned his second pole position of the season.  On October 3, 2010, Kahne started the Price Chopper 400 at Kansas Speedway from the pole position.

On October 20, 2010, Kahne was released from the remainder of his contract with Richard Petty Motorsports. The next day, it was announced that Kahne would drive for Team Red Bull for the remainder of the season as well as the full 2011 season starting with the TUMS Bring It On 500 at Martinsville Speedway.

After the 2010 season finale in Homestead, Kahne went in for knee surgery due to discomfort and pain caused by plica syndrome.

Red Bull Racing (2011)

On April 13, 2010, Kahne announced that he would be leaving Richard Petty Motorsports at the end of the 2010 season to race in 2012 with Hendrick Motorsports, driving the No. 5. On August 10, 2010, Team Red Bull officially announced that Kahne would drive one of their cars for the 2011 NASCAR Sprint Cup season, a tenure that would start in the 2010 season after Kahne was released from RPM. Kahne used the number 4 for his Red Bull Toyota, a homage to the number he used in Sprint Cars. Prior to the acquisition, the No. 4 was made famous by Morgan-McClure Motorsports.  Kahne won his first pole for Red Bull Racing the year prior at the 2010 season finale at Homestead driving the #83. On June 9, 2011, it was announced that Farmers Insurance Group would sponsor Kahne for 22 races in 2012. It was also announced that his current crew chief Kenny Francis will join him at Hendrick.

Kahne dominated the early stages of the Brickyard 400, but spun late in the race and had to settle for 18th position. He led 48 laps, a race-high.

He did not make it into the 2011 Chase for the Sprint Cup, resting at 21st in points following the cut-off race, the Wonderful Pistachios 400 at Richmond International Raceway on September 10.

On November 13, 2011, at the newly configured Phoenix International Raceway, Kahne held off Carl Edwards in the closing laps to take his first victory of the season, his first victory for Team Red Bull, and Kahne's first victory in over two years. Kahne only led the final 14 laps of the race.

Kahne finished the 2011 season 14th in points behind Clint Bowyer.

Hendrick Motorsports (2012–17)
In 2012, Kahne drove the No. 5 Farmers Insurance/Quaker State/HendrickCars.com-sponsored Chevrolet for Hendrick Motorsports, consequent with Mark Martin's move to Michael Waltrip Racing. In the Budweiser Shootout, he was involved in an early accident in the first segment. His teammates Jeff Gordon, Jimmie Johnson, and Dale Earnhardt Jr. were eliminated in crashes during the second segment. Kahne qualified and ran well in his Gatorade Duel, but in the Daytona 500 was taken out in a crash on lap 188 involving Jamie McMurray, Regan Smith, Carl Edwards, Brad Keselowski, Tony Stewart, and Aric Almirola. He finished 29th.

Kahne announced in late-March that he would compete for Turner Motorsports in the Camping World Truck Series at Rockingham Speedway in April, driving the No. 4 in the Good Sam Roadside Assistance 200. In that race, he led 47 laps and went on to win.

Kahne had a rough start to 2012, finishing no better than 14th in the first five races. However, he rebounded with seven straight Top 10 finishes, including a win in the 2012 Coca-Cola 600 in his 300th Sprint Cup Start. This was also his first win with Hendrick Motorsports.
On July 15, 2012, Kahne won the Lenox Industrial Tools 301 at Loudon, and along with teammate Jeff Gordon made the Chase through the two Wild Card spots. During the Chase, Kahne won poles at Talladega and Kansas. He ended the season a career-best fourth place in the points, with two wins, four poles, 12 Top 5’s and 19 Top 10’s.

Kahne had a slow start to 2013, finishing 36th and 19th at Daytona and Phoenix, respectively. However, at Las Vegas, he led 114 laps (which was almost twice the number of laps he had led in all of his previous Vegas starts) and finished second to Matt Kenseth despite an impressive charge in the last laps. Kahne was able to redeem himself for this near-miss the following week by winning at Bristol. After Bristol, he had a strong run at Auto Club Speedway in which he finished ninth—he then had an even stronger run at Martinsville, where he had one of the best cars and finished fourth. He then finished 11th at Texas. At Kansas, Kahne again finished second to Kenseth in a finish very similar to the finish at Las Vegas.

Kahne's season also started with a number of run-ins with Kyle Busch, who wrecked him in three of the first 11 races: at the Daytona 500, Kahne was running in the Top 5 when Busch turned him approaching turn 1 on lap 33, resulting in a seven-car wreck also collecting Tony Stewart, Juan Pablo Montoya, Jamie McMurray, and other cars. At Talladega, on lap 43, Kahne was in the outside lane when Busch turned him into the wall again heading towards turn 1. Kahne bounced off the wall and back into Busch and collected an additional 14 cars, including Kevin Harvick, David Reutimann, Brian Vickers, Tony Stewart, Marcos Ambrose, Greg Biffle, Jeff Burton, Casey Mears, Jamie McMurray, Jeff Gordon, Kurt Busch, David Stremme, and Scott Speed. Later, at Darlington, another incident happened when Busch sent Kahne into the wall while being challenged for the lead late-race, causing a caution. At the Coca-Cola 600, Kahne had influenza and there was doubt he could finish the race. This didn't stop him from leading the most laps and nearly winning the race, but Kevin Harvick got by him on a restart with 11 laps to go. At Michigan, Kahne led the race, but slid into the turn 2 wall, and the car caught fire. Kahne finished 38th, and dropped down four spots in the points standings to 12th.

Following the DNF at Michigan, Kahne rebounded with a sixth-place finish at Sonoma and an 11th-place finish at Kentucky. At Daytona, Kahne was running behind Jimmie Johnson for most of the race until he got tagged by Marcos Ambrose on a late restart, sending him into the inside wall on the back straightaway and relegating him to a 32nd-place finish. This was followed by an 11th-place finish at New Hampshire, and a third-place finish at Indianapolis.

At Pocono in August, Kahne started 18th. He led 66 laps of the race and was involved in a tight battle with Tony Stewart for the lead in the final laps. A decision by Gordon to take the final restart on lap 158 on the inside lane gave Kahne the opportunity to draft past Gordon in turn 1 and then sail away to his second career Pocono race victory and second win of the 2013 season, bringing him up to eighth place in the points. His form didn't carry to Watkins Glen, though, where he was wrecked by Matt Kenseth on a late restart that saw him collide with Dale Earnhardt Jr. and finish 34th. Kahne then had a seventh-place finish at Michigan, and then a runner-up finish at Bristol behind Kenseth for the third time in 2013.

He qualified for the Chase, but any chance of him winning ended with a crash at Loudon. Early in the 2013 Sylvania 300, Kahne got loose, wheel-hopped and hit a barrier extremely hard. Kahne was uninjured but caused controversy when he acted like he could not hear a reporter in his interview which led many to speculate that Kahne suffered a head injury. Kahne apologized for causing the false alarm and said he was too angry to talk about it and that he was not injured.

Kahne struggled in the first half of the 2014 season. He came close to a win at Pocono in June but hit the outside barrier late in the event, costing him his shot at the win. Kahne said that Kyle Busch was yet again responsible for the crash and Busch himself took responsibility that night. When Kahne heard that Busch apologized for the wreck he shrugged it off and said "I don't care to talk to him anymore about our wrecks. Tired of his aggressiveness and the fact that his performances are affecting my own results."

Kahne began ending rumors of his departure from Hendrick Motorsports with a sponsorship extension with Farmers Insurance for 12 races in the 2015–2017 seasons. At the Brickyard 400, Kahne led 70 laps due to great track position but lost the lead on a restart with 17 laps left to Jeff Gordon and ended up sixth.

At Atlanta, Kahne controlled the final 15 laps of the race. With three laps to go, it seemed like he lost it when a caution came out. He lost four spots on pit road, but after two more cautions, sped by Matt Kenseth and won the race to clench a spot in the Chase. It was his first only win of 2014. He finished 15th in the standings being eliminated from round 2 of the Chase. Kahne received a three-year contract extension with HMS in November, which would run until the conclusion of the 2018 season. It was announced a day earlier that long time engineer and Jamie McMurray's 2014 crew chief, Keith Rodden, would return to HMS and replace Kenny Francis as Kahne's crew chief. Francis had been Kahne's crew chief since the 2005 NASCAR Nextel Cup race at Homestead-Miami Speedway. Replacing Francis ended the second-longest driver/crew chief pairing in NASCAR in the first two decades of the 21st century.

Kahne made his return to the Camping World Truck Series driving the No. 00 Haas Automation-sponsored Silverado for JR Motorsports at Charlotte. Kahne beat 18-year-old Erik Jones by 0.005 seconds which was tied for the second closest finish in NASCAR Truck Series competition. The win was Chevrolet's 200th win in the Camping World Truck Series. In the Cup series, Kahne would start off with a ninth-place finish in the Daytona 500. He would struggle throughout most of the year, and would only get 10 Top 10’s and three Top 5’s, his best finish being fourth at Phoenix, Dover, and the Kansas Chase race. Kahne finished the season in 18th-place in the final points standings.

Kahne experienced a difficult 2016 season as he finished 17th in the final points standings with only three Top 5’s and 13 Top 10’s. During the season, Kahne did not lead a single lap in any race despite completing the most laps in the series.

Kahne's 2017 Season started off similar to previous years, but did manage to lead laps over compared to the previous year. After disappointing races at the beginning of the year, things began to look up. In July 2017, Kahne returned to Victory Lane at the Brantley Gilbert Big Machine Brickyard 400, surviving a crash-laden race that took out many contending cars, including holding off Brad Keselowski on an overtime restart that ended under caution. It was Kahne's 18th win in the Cup Series and first in 102 races. The race was also the reason that the NASCAR sanctioning body eliminated the Overtime Line.

On August 7, 2017, Hendrick Motorsports announced Kahne would not be returning to the team for the 2018 season, and two days later, William Byron was announced as Kahne's replacement. It was simultaneously announced that the No. 5 car, Hendrick's original entry in NASCAR, would disappear from Hendrick Motorsports going forward. In 2020, the No. 5 car returned when it was assigned to Kyle Larson.

After the opening race in the chase at Chicagoland Speedway, crew chief Keith Rodden was replaced with Darian Grubb after many lackluster finishes. Right away, Kahne was one of the fastest cars at Loudon, but bad luck plagued the 5 team in the Playoffs and had an early playoff exit. At the end of the season, he ended up with a career low in Top 10's with six and tied his career low of Top 5's with three. He also led 41 laps in 2017, his second career lowest after the aforementioned 2016 season where he didn't lead a lap at all. Kahne announced he would drive the 95 Leavine Family Racing Chevrolet Camaro ZL1 in 2018, replacing Michael McDowell.

Leavine Family Racing (2018)

On September 19, 2017, Kahne announced he would be driving the No. 95 for Leavine Family Racing in 2018. In the offseason, Leavine announced he would pair up with Hendrick Motorsports team engineer Travis Mack who previously substituted for Greg Ives when he Crew Chiefed for Dale Earnhardt Jr. to his best run in 2017. Kahne finished 10th in the All Star race after going four laps down from a wreck. After a very disappointing first half, that included his best run of 17th place on three occasions and a firing of crew chief Travis Mack for lead engineer John Leonard. He led a season high 17 laps and scored the most points at the Coke Zero 400 at Daytona, on the final restart, Kahne tried to make a move to the lead but stalled out due to not getting help. He fell back in line and finished fourth, a season best for him, tying the team's best finish as well as moving up three spots in the standings to 25th.

On August 16, 2018, Kahne stated his intention to step away from full-time competition at the end of the year. On September 6, 2018, after heat exhaustion from the race before at Darlington, Kahne announced that he would sit out the 2018 Brickyard 400 at Indianapolis and be replaced by Regan Smith, which would be the first race Kahne had not raced in since he began his full time career in the Cup Series. Following the Brickyard race it was announced that Kahne would continue to sit out for the next three races with Smith still filling in.

On October 9, 2018, he announced on Twitter that he will sit out for the remainder of the year, ending his 15-year career prematurely.

Return to dirt racing
On March 29, 2019, Kahne was injured in a hard sprint car accident at Williams Grove Speedway, and Australian driver James McFadden replaced him. Kahne did not race again for over a year, with his first race back coming at Knoxville Raceway on May 8, 2020; he finished 11th in the last chance qualifier.

On December 22, 2021, Kahne announced that he would compete full-time with the World of Outlaws in 2022 driving the Kasey Kahne Racing No. 9 car.

Personal life
Kahne and his former girlfriend Samantha Sheets became parents on October 13, 2015, to a son named Tanner. The couple is known to have an amicable relationship following their split sometime before 2018.

Kahne began dating Amy Long, a former reporter, in 2020. Kahne and Amy are expecting twin girls in late 2023.

Film and television
Kahne was featured in the premiere episode of the 2006 Biography Channel series Driven to Win.  This 30-minute program covered Kahne's childhood and entry into NASCAR, as well as his 2004 Rookie of the Year season and his first win in 2005. He was also featured in two episodes of the second season of NASCAR 360 on the FX Network.

Kasey Kahne Racing, NASCAR Media Group and Motorsports Management International partnered to produce the 2009 release, "The Rise of Kahne."  This 90-minute biographical profile features interviews with Kahne, his family and other NASCAR personalities.  Footage covers the stock-car racer's open-wheel roots and successes leading up to his June 2009 win at Infineon Raceway, his first for Richard Petty Motorsports.  The DVD also shows his work with the Kasey Kahne Foundation and his own sprint car race team.

Kahne's No. 9 Dodge Dealers car appeared in the 2005 Disney film Herbie: Fully Loaded, with Kahne as one of the four drivers who boxed Herbie in and pummeled him in the final race. He is mentioned by name by one of the race announcers.

In 2010, Kahne made a brief appearance in the music video "Smoke a Little Smoke" by Eric Church.

Motorsports career results

NASCAR
(key) (Bold – Pole position awarded by qualifying time. Italics – Pole position earned by points standings or practice time. * – Most laps led.)

Monster Energy Cup Series

Daytona 500

Xfinity Series

Camping World Truck Series

K&N Pro Series East

Whelen Modified Tour

 Season still in progress
 Ineligible for series points

ARCA Re/Max Series
(key) (Bold – Pole position awarded by qualifying time. Italics – Pole position earned by points standings or practice time. * – Most laps led.)

References

External links

 
 Kasey Kahne Racing
 
 

Living people
1980 births
American people of German descent
People from Enumclaw, Washington
Racing drivers from Washington (state)
NASCAR drivers
Atlantic Championship drivers
World of Outlaws drivers
Motorsport team owners
Robert Yates Racing drivers
Evernham Motorsports drivers
Hendrick Motorsports drivers
USAC Silver Crown Series drivers
Kyle Busch Motorsports drivers
JR Motorsports drivers